Graham Wood (15 September 1971 – 19 July 2017) was an Australian jazz pianist and educator.

Career
Wood taught jazz piano at the Western Australian Academy of Performing Arts in Perth, Western Australia, in 2001, became head of the jazz department in 2005, and Program Director of Music in 2006.

In 2009, he opened The Ellington Jazz Club in Perth, Western Australia. In its first year, the venue put on 520 shows and featured 2,586 musicians.

Wood was a PhD candidate at the University of Western Australia School of Music and completed his thesis in 2010 entitled "Factors affecting the performance wellness of jazz pianists in practice and performance". He presented two papers at the Performing Arts Medicine Association annual conference in Aspen, Colorado.

He received a 2002 commission from the Fremantle International Jazz Festival to compose a one-hour work entitled "Joan".

Wood contracted cholangiocarcinoma, a rare form of bile duct cancer, in 2013; he died on 19 July 2017, at the age of 45.

Awards

West Australian Music Industry Awards
The West Australian Music Industry Awards are annual awards celebrating achievements for Western Australian music. They commenced in 1985.

|-
| 2010 || The Graham Wood Trio || Best Jazz Act || 
|-
| 2017 || Graham Wood || Hall of Fame || 
|-

Other sources
Collins, Simon. The West Australian, Perth, 21 May 2010.
Banks, Ron. "The West Australian", Perth, 17 March 2009.
Peterson, Sandra. "The Sunday Times Home Magazine", Perth, 30 May 2010.
Gordon, Bob. "X-Press Magazine", Perth, 4 March 2010
Appleby, Rosalind. "The West Australian", Perth, 9 August 2009
John, Richard. "The Australian", Sydney, 29 January 2002
Spencer, Doug. "ABC Radio National, The Weekend Planet"
Blue, Eliza. "ABC News, Stateline Western Australian"

References

1971 births
2017 deaths
Musicians from Perth, Western Australia
University of Western Australia alumni
Australian jazz pianists
Jazz fusion pianists
Deaths from cancer in Western Australia
Deaths from cholangiocarcinoma